The Suzuki FM50, also known as the Suzuki Landie (and sometimes spelt Landy) was an entry level scooter manufactured in the 1970s and 1980s by the Suzuki Motor Company.

FM50
Motor scooters
Mopeds
Two-stroke motorcycles
Motorcycles introduced in the 1970s